Vereeniging Nederlandsch Indische Padvinders (NIPV) was the national Scouting organization in the Dutch East Indies (now Indonesia). This was founded in 1916 and had a boys and girls branch.

Scouting came to Indonesia in 1912, as branch of the Nederlandsche Padvinders Organisatie (NPO, Netherlands Pathfinder Organisation), the first Dutch Scouting organization. The NPO was open to both boys and girls. In 1916 in the Netherlands the "Nederlandsche Padvinders Organisatie" and the "Nederlandsche Padvinders Bond" (NPB) merged to form "De Nederlandsche Padvinders" (NPV). The NPV was boys only. De Dutch East Indies branch remamed to  the Vereeniging Nederlandsch Indische Padvinders (NIPV, Association of Dutch Indies Pathfinders), but stayed open for boys and girls.  

As the Dutch East Indies, Indonesia had been a branch of the Netherlands Scout Association, yet Scouting was very popular, and had achieved great numbers and standards.

Organisation
The NIPV consisted of two parts, the "Padvindersbond" (Scouts' Union) for the boys and the "Meisjesgilde" (Girls' Guild) for the girls. A number of organisations were affiliated to NIPV, in 1934: 
 Pandu Indonesia, before 1930  "Jong Indonesische Padvinders-Organisatie" (JIPO, Young Indonesian Scout Organisation) 
 The Chinese Scout Unions
Shiong Tih Hui
Chung Hsioh
Hua Chao
 Indo Europeesch Verbond (IEV, Indo-European Union)
 Stichting Jong Holland (Young Holland Foundation)
 Katholieke Padvindersbonden (KPB, Catholic Scout Unions)

See also
 Gerakan Pramuka Indonesia, the modern scouting organization in Indonesia

References

Further reading
 Scouting 'Round the World, John S. Wilson, first edition, Blandford Press 1959

External links
 Pine Tree Web
 Official Homepage of Scouting Nederland
 A brief history of Scouting Nederland
 Dutch Scoutwiki

Scouting in Indonesia
Scouting and Guiding in the Netherlands
Youth organizations established in 1916